Lynda Sorenson, is a politician in Northwest Territories, Canada.

She was elected twice to the Legislative Assembly of Northwest Territories. She was elected in the 1979 Northwest Territories general election and again in the 1983 Northwest Territories general election.

Sorenson has been a high-profile Liberal in the territory, she ran for the Liberal Party of Canada in Western Arctic in the 1984 Canadian federal election finishing third in a tight three-way race.

References

External links
Frame Lake News December 2002
Still Counting Women in Politics Across Canada

Candidates in the 1984 Canadian federal election
Living people
People from Yellowknife
Women MLAs in the Northwest Territories 
20th-century Canadian women politicians
Liberal Party of Canada candidates for the Canadian House of Commons
Year of birth missing (living people)